Dobias or Dobiaš is a surname. Notable people with the surname include:

Čeněk Dobiáš (1919–1980), Czech painter
Frank Dobias (1902–?), Austrian-born American children's books illustrator
Josef Dobiáš (1886–1981), Czech chess player
Karol Dobiaš (born 1947), Slovak football player
Timon Dobias (born 1989), Slovak football player
Václav Dobiáš (1909–1978), Czech composer
Vojtěch Dobiáš (born 2000), Czech ice hockey player